Marcus Tullius Decula was a consul of the Roman Republic in 81 BC alongside Gnaeus Cornelius Dolabella, during the dictatorship of Sulla; but the consuls of that year were only nominal, as Sulla had all the power in his hands. (Cic. de Leg. Ayr. ii. 14 ; Gellius, xv. 28 ; Appian, B. C. i. 100.)

His father was perhaps Marcus Tullius, triumvir monetalis in 120 BC.

References

Bibliography 

 Michael Crawford, Roman Republican Coinage, Cambridge University Press, 1974.

Decula, Marcus
Senators of the Roman Republic
1st-century BC Romans